Dry Creek is a stream in St. Francois County in the U.S. state of Missouri. It is a tributary of the Flat River.

Dry Creek was named for the fact it often runs  dry.

See also
List of rivers of Missouri

References

Rivers of St. Francois County, Missouri
Rivers of Missouri